Malevolent Republic: A Short History of the New India is a book by Indian author K. S. Komireddi, which chronicles the rise of Hindu Nationalism in India and expands upon the circumstances that led to it. The book was subject to highly positive reception.

References 

2019 non-fiction books
Indian non-fiction books
21st-century Indian books
C. Hurst & Co. books